Conway Municipal Airport  is a public use airport located 10 miles southwest of Conway, at Cantrell Field in Faulkner County, Arkansas, United States, owned by the City of Conway.

The new airport opened in September 2014 as a replacement for the old Dennis F. Cantrell Field airport in the centre of Conway.

Facilities and aircraft 
All airfield lighting is provided by state-of-the-art LEDs, and the airport is served by GPS WAAS/LPV approaches to both runways.

References

External links 

Official Website
 
 

Airports in Arkansas
Transportation in Faulkner County, Arkansas
2014 establishments in Arkansas